Black Creek Crossing is a thriller horror novel by John Saul, published by Ballantine Books on March 16, 2004. The novel follows the story of teenage Angel Sullivan, who moves into a new house in a new town with her family, and she learns of a brutal murder that occurred in her new home, and begins to think it may be haunted.

Plot summary
Angel Sullivan is an outcast, unable to find any true acceptance anywhere - not at school and certainly not at home, where she's at the mercy of her alcoholic father's anger. When her aunt calls and the family moves to Roundtree, Massachusetts, everyone is hopeful that they'll be able to make a fresh start. Shortly after arriving Angel meets Seth, who is in a similar situation as he is also bullied by his schoolmates and has to put up with an abusive father. The two find solace in one another and it's through Seth that Angel discovers that her new home has a dark and sinister supernatural past that threatens to put an end to Angel and her family.

Reception
Critical reception for Black Creek Crossing was positive, with Booklist calling it "remarkably gratifying". Book Reporter's Joe Hartlaub praised the book, saying that "Saul's ultimate strength in Black Creek Crossing... is his ability to explore the world of adolescent angst, to get into those areas where the triple gratings of school, friends and family rub the skin of the psyche raw." Blogcritics.org praised the book, calling it "a respectable read, if not a home run."

Publishers Weekly panned Black Creek Crossing, writing "the chills are few and far between in this lackluster, paint-by-the-numbers horror tale".

References

Footnotes

2004 American novels
2000s horror novels
American horror novels
American thriller novels